Henry Wilson (1812–1875) was the 18th vice president of the United States and a U.S. senator from Massachusetts.

Henry Wilson may also refer to:

Other politicians
 Henry Wilson (Pennsylvania politician) (1778–1826), United States Congressman
 Henry Wilson (Suffolk politician) (1797–1866), MP for West Suffolk
 Henry Wilson (Holmfirth MP) (1833–1914), MP for Holmfirth
 Henry Lumpkin Wilson (1839–1917), Atlanta physician and city councilman
 Henry Lane Wilson (1857–1932), U.S. Ambassador to Mexico
 Sir Henry Wilson, 1st Baronet (1864–1922), MP assassinated by the IRA
 Henry Wilson, Baron Wilson of Langside (1916–1997), Scottish lawyer, Labour politician and life peer

Military
 Henry J. Wilson (U.S. Army officer) (1793–1872)
 Henry Fuller Maitland Wilson (1859–1941), World War I British general
 Henry Braid Wilson (1861–1954), U.S. Navy admiral
 Sir Henry Wilson, 1st Baronet (1864–1922), World War I British general
 Henry Maitland Wilson (1881–1964), World War II British general

Religion
 Henry Bristow Wilson (1803–1888), theologian and fellow of St John's College, Oxford
 Henry Wilson (bishop) (1876–1961), bishop of Chelmsford and author

Sports
 Henry Wilson (cricketer) (1865–1914), Australian cricketer
 Henry Wilson (rugby union) (1869–1945), New Zealand rugby union player and cricketer
 Henry Wilson (baseball) (1876–?), American baseball player
 Henry Wilson (basketball) (born 1960s), American basketball player

Others
 Henry Wilson (sailor) (1740–1810), captain of the Antelope and first European visitor to Palau
 Henry Schütz Wilson (1824–1902), English writer
 Henry Van Peters Wilson (1863–1939), biology professor
 Henry Wilson (architect) (1864–1934), British architect, jeweller, and designer
 Henry J. Wilson (farmer) (1904–1985), English farmer and military officer
 Henry Leroy Willson (talent agent) (1911-1978), gay Hollywood agent who made many gay actors into stars in post-World War II Hollywood most notably Rock Hudson.

Other uses
 USS Henry B. Wilson, a guided missile armed destroyer

See also
 Hack Wilson (1900–1948), Major League Baseball player
 Hank Wilson (1947–2008), LGBT and AIDS activist
 Harry Wilson (disambiguation)
 Henry Willson (1911–1978), Hollywood agent
 Henry Wilson-Fox (1863–1921), English lawyer, journalist, tennis player, and businessman

Wilson, Henry